Archibald Robinson (born 9 July 1890) was an Australian rules footballer who played for the Richmond Football Club in the Victorian Football League (VFL).

Family
The son of William George Robinson (1840-1894), and Elizabeth Ann Robinson (1854-1913), née Lowns, Archibald Robinson was born at Mitta Mitta, Victoria on 9 July 1890.

He married Edith Robinson Whitehead (1889-1966), later Mrs. John Francis Muir, on 11 January 1913; their only child was stillborn on 22 August 1913. They were divorced in 1921.

Football

Melbourne City (VFA)
In 1912 he was cleared from Richmond to the Melbourne City Football Club in the VFA.

Military service
He enlisted in the First AIF on 17 August 1914, served overseas with the 7th Battalion, was in the first landings at Gallipoli on 25 April 1915, and was transferred to the Australian Army Provost Corps in 1916.

He was wounded twice in action, and returned to Australia on 20 October 1918.

Notes

References
 Hogan P: The Tigers Of Old, Richmond FC, (Melbourne), 1996. 
 
 First World War Embarkation Roll: Private Archibald Robinson (141), collection of the Australian War Memorial.
 First World War Nominal Roll: Corporal Archibald Robinson (141), collection of the Australian War Memorial.
 First World War Service Record: Corporal Archibald Robinson (141), National Archives of Australia.

External links 
 		
 
 Arch Robinson, The VFA Project

Year of death missing
1890 births
Australian rules footballers from Victoria (Australia)
Richmond Football Club players
Melbourne City Football Club (VFA) players
Port Melbourne Football Club players
Hawthorn Football Club (VFA) players
Northcote Football Club players
Australian military personnel of World War I